Paul Martin Andrews (born 1959) is an American rape survivor and an advocate for rape survivors.

Background
In 1973, Andrews was kidnapped in his native Virginia and hidden in an underground box by the convicted child abuser Richard Ausley. Thirty years after his ordeal, he went public with his story and became an activist for bolstering Virginia law with additional funding for continued civil commitments for sex offenders after their criminal sentences end.

In this case, Virginia did not get a chance to test its new Civil Commitment for Sexually Violent Predators Act. Ausley's sentence was extended by five years after another victim came forward.

In January 2004, Ausley was murdered in his prison cell by his cell mate Dewey Keith Venable. Andrews later said that he did not hate Ausley, and did not wish his death.

See also
List of kidnappings
List of solved missing person cases

References

External links
 "Boxed in: A boy's lost week", By Paul Andrews, Jan 30th, 2003, The Hook
 "Going public: Andrews talks, and the governor listens"
 "No way out: how the state helped kill a convict"
 "Save your tears: Ausley was no victim"
 "The Boy in the Box"

1959 births
1970s missing person cases
Formerly missing people
Living people
Kidnapped American children
Missing person cases in Virginia
People from Portsmouth, Virginia
Sexual abuse victim advocates
Violence against men in North America